Parliamentary elections were held in Colombia on 15 March 1953 to elect the Chamber of Representatives. The Liberal Party and the Communist Party both boycotted the elections, and as a result, the seats reserved for the minority party were left vacant. The Conservative Party won the remainder.

Results

References

Parliamentary elections in Colombia
Colombia
1953 in Colombia
One-party elections
Election and referendum articles with incomplete results